Walter Stratton House is a historic home located at Roxbury in Delaware County, New York, United States. It was built in 1828 and is a small -story building on a deep fieldstone basement with a gable roof. It has a 1-story recessed frame wing.  Also on the property is a 1-story frame garage.  It is one of six extant stone houses in the town.

It was listed on the National Register of Historic Places in 2002.

See also
National Register of Historic Places listings in Delaware County, New York

References

Houses on the National Register of Historic Places in New York (state)
National Register of Historic Places in Delaware County, New York
Houses completed in 1828
Houses in Delaware County, New York